Zirconium chloride refers to:

 Zirconium(III) chloride
 Zirconium(IV) chloride, or zirconium tetrachloride